This is a list of notable people who are associated with the Seventh-day Adventist Church. In addition to living and deceased members, the list also includes Millerites and notable former Seventh-day Adventists.

Academia
 Niels-Erik Andreasen – former president at Andrews University and Walla Walla College; also former teacher at Pacific Union College and former dean of Loma Linda University School of Religion 
 Delbert Baker – President of Adventist University of Africa
 Sidney Brownsberger (1845–1930) – educator and first president of Healdsburg College (1882–1886)
 Gary Chartier – American legal scholar; philosopher and author who is Associate Dean and Professor of Law and Business ethics at La Sierra University
 Eva Beatrice Dykes (1893–1986) – taught Dunbar High School; Walden University; Howard University, and was chair of the English department and the Division of Humanities at Oakwood University 
 Larry Geraty – archaeologist; 7th president of Atlantic Union College (1985–1993), and 2nd president of La Sierra University (1993–2007)
 Siegfried Horn (1908–1993) – German archaeologist; Bible scholar; author, and Professor of History of Antiquity and Dean of the Seventh-day Adventist Theological Seminary
 Milton E. Kern (1875–1961) – President of Foreign Mission Seminary (1910–1914); Dean of the Seventh-day Adventist Theological Seminary (1934–1943), and Chairperson of the Ellen G. White Estate (1944–1951)
 Heather Knight – 21st president of Pacific Union College (2009–2016)
 Dr. Norman Maphosa – Zimbabwean who is the former Vice Chancellor of Solusi University (1992–2011); former Zimsec board chairman and current Director General of Zimbabwe Institute of Public Management
 Malcolm Maxwell (1934–2007) – 19th president of Pacific Union College (1983–2001) and son of Arthur S. Maxwell
 Richard Osborn – 20th president of Pacific Union College (2001–2009); founder of the Association of Adventist Colleges and Universities; former principal of Takoma Academy; former Education director of Columbia Union Conference; former Vice-President for Education for the North American Division; former president of the Council for American Private Education; chairman of the Association of Independent California Colleges and Universities & Vice-President of the Western Association of Schools and Colleges
 Leslie Pollard - African-american who is the 11th president of Oakwood University
 W. W. Prescott (1855–1944) – President of Battle Creek College (1885–1894); founded Union College and became the first president in 1891; became president of Walla Walla College in 1891; founded Avondale School for Christian Workers; editor of the Review and Herald, and vice president of the General Conference of Seventh-day Adventists
 Denton E. Rebok (1897–1983) – taught at Washington Missionary College, La Sierra College,; president of Southern Missionary College; Dean of the Seventh-day Adventist Theological Seminary; Chairperson of the Ellen G. White Estate (1952) and missionary to China 
 Dr. Leona G. Running (1916–2014) – first female linguist and Bible scholar at Seventh-day Adventist Theological Seminary (1955–2002) and first female president of the Chicago Society of Biblical Research (1981–1982)
 Homer Russell Salisbury (1870–1915) – American professor, minister and missionary who founded Duncombe Hall College, taught at Claremont Union College; also former president of the South England Conference and Indian Union Mission. Killed when the SS Persia was sunk by a German submarine, during World War I.
 John Luis Shaw (1870–1952) – educator; missionary and treasurer

Literature
 Ray Garton – horror novelist raised Adventist; credits his interest in horror to a reaction to the beasts in Bible prophecy (see: Seventh-day Adventist eschatology)
 Hesba Fay Brinsmead (1922–2003) – children's author
 Nathan Brown – author and editor of Signs Publishing Company 
 Candy Carson – African American author; philanthropist and married to Ben Carson
 Diran Chrakian (1875–1921) – Armenian poet, writer, painter, teacher, and victim of the Armenian genocide
 Roswell F. Cottrell (1814–1892) – American writer; hymnist; poet; counselor, and preacher
 Clifford Goldstein – Jewish-American author and editor
 Arthur S. Maxwell (1896–1970) – known as Uncle Arthur, author of the Bedtime Stories series, and The Bible Story set of books, among 112 books
 Roger Morneau (1925–1998) – author on faith and prayer
 Christopher Mwashinga – author and poet, writes in English and Kiswahili
 Andrew Nelson (1893–1975) – missionary and linguist
 Cameron Slater – controversial blogger and editor of New Zealand Truth
 Annie R. Smith (1828–1855) – wrote 12 hymns and four poems
 Steven Spruill – novelist
 Standish brothers, Colin D. (1933–2018) and Russell R. (1933–2008) – identical twin authors

Movies, television, and radio
 Terry Benedict - American film producer who created The Conscientious Objector and co-produced Hacksaw Ridge about Desmond Doss
 Fretzie Bercede – Filipino/Chinese actress, television personality, and former reality show contestant; 3rd placer of Pinoy Big Brother: Teen Clash 2010
 Grigoriy Dobrygin – Russian film and theatre actor; director, and producer
 DeVon Franklin – former Senior Vice President of Columbia TriStar Pictures; moonlights as a preacher; author and married to Meagan Good 
 Antoinette Hertsenberg – Dutch actress and TV presenter and married to Niko Koffeman, a politician who belongs to Party for the Animals
 Darwood Kaye (1929–2002) – former Our Gang actor who spent his adult life as a pastor
 Cesar Montano – multi-awarded Filipino actor, film producer/director; game show host & singer
 Cid Moreira – Brazilian journalist and TV presenter
 Nǃxau ǂToma (1944–2003) – starred as a Kalahari Bushman in the films The Gods Must Be Crazy, The Gods Must Be Crazy 2, Crazy Safari, Crazy in Hong Kong, and The Gods Must Be Funny in China; converted in later life
 Utica Queen – American drag queen and contestant on Rupaul's Drag Race

Painters, illustrators and sculptors
 Harry Anderson (1906–1996) – American painter and illustrator who's clients were American Airlines, The American Magazine, Buster Brown Shoes, Coca-Cola, Collier's, Cosmopolitan, Cream of Wheat, Esso, Ford, Good Housekeeping, Humble Oil, John Hancock Mutual Life Insurance Company, Ladies' Home Journal, Massachusetts Mutual, Ovaltine, Redbook, Review and Herald Publishing Association, The Church of Jesus Christ of Latter-day Saints, The Saturday Evening Post, Woman's Home Companion, and Wyeth; won many award's and also was elected to the Illustrators Hall of Fame in 1994
 Luis Germán Cajiga – Puerto Rican painter; linocutter, and silk-screen printer
 Alan Collins (1928–2016) – American sculptor and art professor at Atlantic Union College (1968–1971), Andrews University (1971–1978) and La Sierra University (1978–1989)
 Greg Constantine – Canadian-American painter and illustrator and retired art professor at Andrews University
 Shirley Ardell Mason (1923–1998) – painter and art teacher who was known as Sybil and had Dissociative identity disorder

Singers, songwriters, musicians, and conductors
 Rose May Alaba - Austrian singer, songwriter, recording artist and sister of David Alaba
 Herbert Blomstedt – Swedish conductor for the Stockholm Philharmonic Orchestra, conductor for the Norrköping Symphony Orchestra (1954–1962), conductor for the Oslo Philharmonic (1962–1968), conductor for the Staatskapelle Dresden (1975–1985), conductor for the Danish Radio Orchestra (1967–1977), music director for the San Francisco Symphony (1985–1995), music director for the NDR Symphony Orchestra (1996–1998), and music director for the Gewandhausorchester Leipzig (1998–2005)
 Charmaine Carrasco - American Christian pop musician
 Committed – winner of the second season of NBC's The Sing-Off
 Del Delker (1924–2018) – American contralto sacred music female vocalist who sang on the Voice of Prophecy
 Roy Drusky (1930-2004) - American Country music singer, songwriter producer, actor and disc jockey
 Manuel Escórcio – South African tenor who sang for the Cape Town City Opera
 Jerome Fontamillas – Filipino American musician
 Muma Gee – Nigerian pop singer-songwriter, actress, fashion designer residing in Port Harcourt
 Anna German (1936–1982) – famous Polish singer 
 Heritage Singers – American gospel group founded by Max and Lucy Mace
 Wayne Hooper (1920–2007) – Musical Director for Voice of Prophecy radio program; composer; baritone
 The Isley Brothers – Grammy Award-winning American musical group consisting of brothers Ron and Ernie Isley
 Iyaz – R&B singer, rapper and songwriter; born Keidran Jones of the Virgin Islands; grew up in the church and still attends from time to time
 King's Heralds – American male gospel music quartet
 Little Richard (1932–2020) – former singer-songwriter and musician of Rock and roll; inducted into the Rock and Roll Hall of Fame (1986), NAACP Image Awards' Hall of Fame (2002) and the Songwriters Hall of Fame (2003).
 Sunny Liu (1924–1987) – minister and singing evangelist
 Joe Lutcher (1919–2006) – American R&B saxophonist and bandleader who abandoned his musical career and witnessed to Little Richard
 Hugh Martin (1914–2011) – American theater and film composer; also accompanist for Del Delker 
 NOTA – winner of the first season of NBC's The Sing-Off
 Kevin Olusola – cellist and beatboxer, member of Grammy Award-winning a cappella group Pentatonix, winners of third season of NBC's The Sing-Of
 Tyler Rand – American arts executive
 Wintley Phipps – singer, songwriter, ordained pastor
 Salt – American rapper & songwriter who was baptized into the Seventh-day Adventist Church on a mission trip in Ethiopia with Oakwood College.
 Take 6 – American a cappella gospel music sextet 
 Rozonda Thomas – singer-songwriter; dancer; actress; television personality and model
 Sverre Valen – retired Norwegian choir conductor
 Davido – Nigerian singer, songwriter and record producer; his father Adedeji Adeleke, Nigerian Billionaire, business magnate, founder and president of Adeleke University is a devout Seventh-Day Adventist

Business
 Will Keith Kellogg (1860–1951) – American who was the co-inventor of cornflakes with brother John Harvey Kellogg; philanthropist who founded the Fellowship Corporation, The Battle Creek Toasted Corn Flake Company, Child Welfare Foundation, W. K. Kellogg Arabian Horse Center, and Ann J. Kellogg School 
 Dale E. Twomley – American who used to be president of Worthington Foods

Law
 Justice Samuel Bosire – former appeal Judge of the High Court of Kenya appointed the chairman of the Goldenberg Commission of Inquiry by President Mwai Kibaki
 James Alexander Chiles (1860–1930) – African American lawyer who argued at the Supreme Court against Chesapeake and Ohio Railroad for desegregation of railroad coaches
 James E. Graves Jr. – Federal Judge on the United States Court of Appeals for the Fifth Circuit since February 2011 was appointed by President Barack Obama and former Supreme court judge in Mississippi
 David Maraga – Chief Justice and President of the Supreme Court of Kenya since 19 October 2016 was appointed by President Uhuru Kenyatta
 Greg Mathis – retired Michigan 36th District Court judge and reality courtroom show judge
 Daniel David Ntanda Nsereko – International Criminal Court judge
 The Honourable Sir Gibuna Gibbs Salika KBE – Chief Justice of the Supreme Court of Papua New Guinea and became Knight Commander of the Order of the British Empire by Queen Elizabeth II

Pioneers
This section includes Millerites (followers of William Miller) who did not necessarily become Seventh-day Adventist:
 J. N. Andrews (1829–1883) – first Seventh-day Adventist missionary; minister; writer; editor of the Adventist Review and 3rd President of the General Conference of Seventh-day Adventists
 Nelson H. Barbour (1824–1905) – Millerite pastor
 Joseph Bates (1792–1872) – seaman; founder of the Seventh-day Adventist Church; wrote a tract on the seventh-day Sabbath which convinced James and Ellen White to start observing it, and minister
 Goodloe Harper Bell (1832–1899) – teacher at first Seventh-day Adventist school
 Sylvester Bliss (1814–1863) – Millerite pastor, author and editor of The Signs of the Times
 O. R. L. Crosier (1820–1912) – Millerite preacher
 Hiram Edson (1806–1882) – evangelist who introduced sanctuary doctrine and started first Seventh-day Adventist press
 Charles Fitch (1805–1844) – Millerite evangelist
 Elon Galusha (1790–1856) – Millerite; minister and lawyer
 Apollos Hale (1807–1898) – Millerite and minister
 Stephen N. Haskell (1833–1922) – evangelist; missionary; author; editor; president of the New England Conference (1870–1887), president of the California Conference (1879–1887 and 1891–1894) and president of the Maine Conference (1884–1886)
 Joshua V. Himes (1805–1895) – Millerite evangelist and promoter
 J. N. Loughborough (1832–1924) – early Seventh-day Adventist pastor
 William Miller (1782–1849) – founder of the Millerite movement from which Seventh-day Adventism and other groups emerged
 George Washington Morse (1816–1909) – Millerite Adventist; evangelist and missionary
 T. M. Preble (1810–1907) – Millerite pastor, early Sabbath supporter
 Uriah Smith (1832–1903) – author; poet; hymn writer; teacher; inventor; engraver, and editor of the Review and Herald
 Samuel S. Snow (1806–1890) – Millerite preacher
 George Storrs (1796–1879) – Millerite preacher and writer
 John T. Walsh (1816–1886) – Millerite and minister
 Henry Dana Ward (1797–1884) – Millerite and abolitionist
 Jonas Wendell (1815–1873) – Millerite evangelist
 Ellen G. White (1827–1915) – a founder of the Seventh-day Adventist Church; had 2,000 visions and dreams from God; wrote articles; pamphlets and books including the Conflict of the Ages series
 James Springer White (1821–1881) – a founder of the Seventh-day Adventist Church; founder of The Present Truth, and 2nd, 4th, and 6th President of the General Conference of Seventh-day Adventists (1865–1867, 1869–1871, and 1874–1880); husband of Ellen White

Church administration leaders

 Stennett H. Brooks (1932–2008) – pastor and President of the Northeastern Conference of Seventh-day Adventists
 Mikhail P. Kulakov (1927–2010) – pastor; social and religious activist; Bible scholar/translator; founder of the International Association of Religious Freedom; founder of the Institute for Bible Translation; founder of the Russian Bible Society and head of the church in the former Soviet Union
 Ella Simmons – only woman to be a Vice President of the General Conference of Seventh-day Adventists; chair of the Department of Education at Kentucky State University (1988–1990); Assistant professor and associate dean of the School of Education at the University of Louisville (1990–1997); Vice President for academic affairs at Oakwood University (1997); Provost and Vice President for Academic Administration at La Sierra University (2000–2004)
 James D. Standish – Australian who used to be the communications director, Religious Liberty and Public Affairs for the South Pacific Division of Seventh-day Adventists; also former head of news and editorial for Adventist Record (2011–2016)
 Hendrik Sumendap – Indonesian pastor and former Executive Secretary of the Southern Asia-Pacific Division of Seventh-day Adventists (2007–2008)

Government
 Kwadwo Owusu Afriyie (1957–2020) – Ghanaian who was Chief Executive Officer of Forestry Commission of Ghana (2017-2020), general secretary of the New Patriotic Party (2010-2014); and lawyer who died of COVID-19
 Sir Patrick Allen – eighth Governor-General of Jamaica (2009–present) became Knight Commander of the Order of St Michael and St George by Queen Elizabeth II, and former president of the West Indies Union
 Sir Silas Atopare – seventh Governor-General of Papua New Guinea (1997–2003)
 Roscoe Bartlett – served in Maryland's 6th congressional district/U.S. House of Representatives (1993–2013) 
 Simeon Bouro – Solomon Islands Ambassador to Cuba since March 2013; member of Solomon Islands National Parliament (2001–2006)
 Percival Austin Bramble (1901–1988) – Chief Minister of Montserrat British West Indies (1970–1978)
 William Henry Bramble – first Chief Minister of Montserrat British West Indies
 Ronald Brisé – Commissioner for the Florida Public Service Commission and former Florida's 108th congressional district/Florida House of Representatives
 Sir James Carlisle – second Governor-General of Antigua and Barbuda (1993–2007) and dentist
 Ben Carson – director of pediatric neurosurgery at Johns Hopkins Hospital; author; 2016 Republican candidate for president; Secretary of Housing and Urban Development (2017–2021)
 Nelson Castro – New York State Assemblyman, 86th District, (2008–present)
 Ret Chol – former South Sudanese politician
 Cari M. Dominguez – senior of human resources at Bank of America; formerly worked at the United States Department of Labor as Director of the Office of Federal Contract Compliance Programs (1989–1993) and Assistant Secretary for Employment Standards (1991–1993); Director at Spencer Stuart (1993–1995); Partner at Heidrick & Struggles (1995–1998); Principal at Dominguez and Associates (1999–2001); 12th Chairman of Equal Employment Opportunity Commission (2001–2006); Board member of ManpowerGroup (2007–); Board of Director for International Women's Forum; Hispanic Business Roundtable; Founder of Olney Adventist Preparatory School in Olney, Maryland, and the current Senior vice president for human resources for Loma Linda University and Loma Linda University Medical Center
 Kim Gangte – member of parliament in India (1998–1999); educator & human right activist
 Hakainde Hichilema – Seventh President of Zambia, businessman and married to Mutinta Hichilema
 Andrew Holness – ninth Prime Minister of Jamaica, (2011–2012, 2016–present); Leader of the Opposition (Jamaica) (2012–2016)
 Okezie Ikpeazu – ninth Governor of Abia State and the first Seventh-day adventist to be elected to a high position in Nigeria, and also married to Nkechi Ikpeazu
 Samson Kisekka (1912–1999) – fifth Prime Minister of Uganda, (1986–1991); fifth Vice President of Uganda (1991–1994); physician; agriculturalist; businessman; diplomat and writer
 Niko Koffeman – Dutch politician who belongs to Party for the Animals and animal rights activist, married to actress/TV presenter Antoinette Hertsenberg
 Jioji Konousi Konrote – President of Fiji, (2015–2021); Fiji High Commissioner to Australia (2001–2006); former Assistant Secretary General of the United Nations; retired Major-General in Fiji armed forces; former Force Commander of the United Nations interim force in Lebanon; former Ambassador Pleniopotentiary to Singapore, and former Minister of Employment, Labour Relations and Productivity
 Sheila Jackson Lee – U.S. Representative, 18th congressional district of Texas (Houston)
 Gordon Darcy Lilo – former Prime Minister of Solomon Islands
 James Marape – eight Prime Minister of Papua New Guinea (2019–present)
 Eunice Michiles – Brazilian senator
 Floyd Morris – Jamaica's first blind senator (1998–2007), Minister of State in the Ministry of Labour and Social Security (2001–2007), twelfth president of the Senate of Jamaica (2013–2016) and author
 Phelekezela Mphoko – Zimbabwe businessman, former diplomat, former military commander, and Vice President of Zimbabwe under President Robert Mugabe
 Rose Namayanja – Ugandan lawyer; columnist; author; security sector manager and politician
 John Nkomo (1934–2013) – Zimbabwe politician
 Samuel Sipepa Nkomo – Zimbabwe Minister of Water Resources Development and Management
 Manuel Noriega (1934–2017) – dictator of Panama who joined the Seventh-day Adventist Church
 George Nga Ntafu (1943–2015) – Malawian statesman, former Cabinet Minister, and Malawi Parliament Chief Whip
 Ron Oden – African American former openly gay 19th Mayor of Palm Springs (2003–2007) and former ordained minister
 Sam Ongeri – Kenyan Member of Parliament for Nyaribari Masaba Constituency (1988-1992;1997-2002 and 2007-2013), Cabinet Minister for Technical and Vocational Education (1988-1992), Minister of Foreign Affairs (2012-2013), Kisii County senator (2017–present); professor and physician
 Harold Bud Otis – former president of Review and Herald Publishing Association (1978–1988) and president of Frederick County, Maryland
 Jerry Pettis (1916–1975) – member of the U.S. House of Representatives, who represented California's 33rd Congressional District (1966–1975) and 37th Congressional District (1975)
 Shirley Neil Pettis (1924–2016) – member of the U.S. House of Representatives, who represented California's 37th Congressional District (1975–1979)
 Job Pomat– Papua New Guinean Speaker of the National Parliament of Papua New Guinea (2017–present)
 Henry Puna – Prime Minister of the Cook Islands
 Ngereteina Puna – teacher; MP for Arutanga-Reureu-Nikaupara (1989–1999); Speaker of the Cook Islands Parliament (1999–2001), and Minister of Education for Geoffrey Henry (2011–2012)
 John Pundari – Papua New Guinean former Speaker of the National Parliament (1997–1999); Deputy Prime Minister and Minister for Women and Youth (1999); Minister for Lands (2001); Minister for Foreign Affairs (2001); Minister for Mining (2010–2011), and Minister for Environment and Conservation (2012–present) was recognized as a Companion of the Order St Michael by Queen Elizabeth II
 Raul Ruiz – member of the U.S. House of Representatives, representing California's 36th congressional district (2013–)
 Desley Scott – Australian politician; member for Electoral district of Woodridge in the Parliament of Queensland, 2001–2015
 Derek Sloan – member of the House of Commons of Canada for the riding of Hastings—Lennox and Addington (2019–); was expelled from the Conservative Party caucus on January 20, 2021 for receiving a donation from a white supremacist and other issues
 Manasseh Sogavare – Prime Minister of the Solomon Islands, (2000–2001), (2006–2007), (2014–2017) and (2019–present); Leader of the Opposition in Solomon Islands (2007–2010)
 John F. Street – Mayor of the City of Philadelphia (2000–2008)
 Mana Strickland (1918–1996) – Minister of Education of Cook Islands
 Robert Lee Stump (1927–2003) – served in the Arizona House of Representatives and the Arizona State Senate (1959–1976); member of the U.S. House of Representatives, representing Arizona's 3rd Congressional District (1977–2003)
 Sione Taione – Tongan politician
 Hannu Takkula – Finnish politician who was member of Parliament of Finland (1995–2004) and member of European Parliament (2004–2018)
 Marianne Thieme – founder and parliamentary leader of the Dutch animal rights party Animal Party & author
 Ronald Sapa Tlau – Indian member for Mizoram in the Rajya Sabha since June 2014
 Roman Tmetuchl (1926–1999) – Palau governor of Airai; started Palau's first bank and also start a construction company. 
 Carolyn Harding Votaw (1879–1951) – public officeholder in Washington, D.C.; youngest sister of President Warren G. Harding, and missionary to Myanmar (1905–1914)
 James Ronald Webster (1926–2016) – led Anguilla Revolution of 1967; former Chief Minister of Anguilla
 Surangel Whipps Jr. – President of Palau (2021–present); was CEO and President of Surangel and Sons Company from 1992-2021 and lead it to becoming the largest Palauan owned company in the Republic of Palau. 
 George A. Williams (1864–1946) – served as Lieutenant Governor of Nebraska (1925–1931)
 Jorge Talbot Zavala (1921–2014) – Ecuadorian Representative and Secretary of the Camara de Diputados, Quito, Ecuador; Nomina de Legisladores Nacionales (1950–1955), Archivo Nacional del Ecuador (1950–1955)

Scientists, doctors, nurses, and engineers
 Leonard Lee Bailey (1942–2019) – world-renowned heart surgeon who transplanted a baboon's heart into a premature-born baby with underdeveloped heart
 Lottie Isbell Blake (1876–1976) – first SDA Black Physician
 Leonard R. Brand – Loma Linda University paleobiologist
 Mary E. Britton (1855–1925) – physician; educator; journalist; civil rights activist and Suffragist
 Margaret Caro (1848–1938) – first women Dentist on the Register of New Zealand; lecturer; social reformer, and writer
 Alexander A. Clerk – Ghanaian-American teacher; psychiatrist; Sleep medicine specialist and the director of the world's first sleep medical clinic at Stanford University Medical Center
 Robert Gentry (1933–2020) – nuclear physicist and young Earth creationist, known for his claims that radiohalos provide evidence for a young age of the Earth
 Howard Gimbel – Canadian ophthalmologist; senior editor; international speaker; professor at Loma Linda University and associate professor at University of Calgary, has won many awards including the Alberta Order of Excellence and Order of Canada
 Frank Jobe (1925–2014) – orthopedist and sports medicine physician who worked for the Los Angeles Dodgers (1968–2008); 26 years as a consultant for the PGA and Senior PGA and named emeritus physician for the PGA Tour; army medic in World War II; clinical professor at Keck School of Medicine of USC; inducted into American Orthopedic Society of Sports Medicine Hall of Fame, Professional Baseball Athletic Trainers Hall of Fame and Shrine of the Eternals and also received the Dave Winfield Humanitarian Award, Bronze Star Medal, Combat Medical Badge and Glider Badge
 Nettie Florence Keller (1875–1974) – oldest practicing doctor in the world; feminist; prohibitionist; social reformer and missionary to New Zealand
 Frank Lewis Marsh (1899–1992) – creationist and the first Adventist to earn a doctoral degree in biology
 George McCready Price (1870–1963) – missionary and leading early creationist
 Ruth Janetta Temple (1892–1984) – first African American doctor in California and opened first medical clinic in Los Angeles
 Paul Nobuo Tatsuguchi (1911–1943) – Japanese surgeon in the Imperial Japanese Army
 Walter Veith – South African zoologist, author, creationist and end times lecturer

Sports
 Gretchen Abaniel – Filipino professional boxer who won the Women's International Boxing Association Minimumweight Title; Women's International Boxing Federation Minimumweight Title; Global Boxing Union Minimumweight Title; WIBA Intercontinental Minimumweight Title ; WBC International Minimumweight Title and a contestant on The Amazing Race Philippines Season 2
 David Alaba – Austrian association football player and has a sister Rose May Alaba
 Luis Aponte – retired Venezuelan baseball player
 Ed Correa – retired Puerto Rican Major League Baseball pitcher
 Grace Daley – retired African American WNBA basketball player
 Devaun DeGraff – retired Bermudian association football player
 Jimmy Haarhoff – retired British association football player
 Priscah Jeptoo – Kenyan Marathon runner, Olympic and world medalist; winner of the 2013 London Marathon and 2013 New York City Marathon, and founder of Better Living Marathon
 Abel Kirui – Kenyan marathon runner, two-time world champion, Olympic medalist, 2016 Chicago Marathon winner, and founder of Better Living Marathon
 Elijah Lagat – Kenyan marathon runner, winner of the 1997 Berlin Marathon, 1998 Prague Marathon and 2000 Boston Marathon 
 Ljiljana Ljubisic – Canadian who won gold medal in discus and bronze in shot at the 1992 Summer Paralympics & won bronze in the same events at the 1996 Summer Paralympics
 Archie Moore (1916–1998) – American professional boxer (Light Heavyweight World Champion December 1952 – May 1962)
 Amos Tirop Matui – Kenyan marathon runner, winner of the 2005 Singapore Marathon, 2009 Country Music Marathon and Hamburg Half Marathon, and founder of Better Living Marathon.
 Vitor Ressurreição – Brazilian association football goalkeeper
 Carlos Roa – retired Argentine association football goalkeeper 
 Daren Sammy – St. Lucian, West Indies cricketer
 Andrea Silenzi – retired Italian association football player
 Davion Taylor - African-American linebacker in the National Football League

Theologians, ministers and evangelists
 M. L. Andreasen (1876–1962) – theologian, protested against the book Questions on Doctrine, and was influential in "historic Adventism"
 Samuele Bacchiocchi (1938–2008) – theologian and author who wrote From Sabbath to Sunday, based on his study at the Pontifical Gregorian University, at which he is the only non-Catholic to have enrolled
 Bryan W. Ball – theologian; academic; author; teacher; former principal of Avondale College, and former president of South Pacific Division of Seventh-day Adventists
 Shawn Boonstra – former Speaker/Director of It Is Written Canada and 3rd Speaker/Director of It Is Written (2004–2011) and 5th Speaker/Director of Voice of Prophecy (2010–present)
 John Burden (1862–1942) – minister; administrator, and medical missionary to Australia
 Edwin Butz (1864–1956) – pastor and missionary to Australia and Tonga
 Arthur Carscallen (1879–1964) – pastor; administrator; linguist; publisher, and missionary to Kenya
 John Carter – pastor; evangelist, and founder of The Carter Report
 E. E. Cleveland (1921–2009) – pastor; evangelist; civil rights leader; author, and teacher at Oakwood College
 Raymond Cottrell (1911–2003) – theologian; teacher; writer; editor; associate editor of the Adventist Review and the Seventh-day Adventist Bible Commentary, and missionary to China
 Richard M. Davidson – Old Testament scholar, and author of Flame of Yahweh
 Herbert E. Douglass (1927–2014) – American theologian who was president of Atlantic Union College (1967–1970); associate editor of Adventist Review (1970–1976); associate book editor and vice-president for Editorial Development at Pacific Press Publishing Association (1979–1985); president of Weimar Institute (1985–1992); vice-president for philanthropy at Adventist Heritage Ministry (1997–2001), and consultant for Amazing Facts (2003–2005)
 Jon Dybdahl – theologian and college administrator
 Henry Feyerabend (1931–2006) – Canadian evangelist; singer, and author
 Mark Finley – pastor; evangelist and 2nd Speaker/Director of It Is Written 1991–2004
 Desmond Ford (1929–2019) – Australian pastor fired for criticizing the investigative judgment teaching, resulting in the most controversial dismissal ever in the church
 Le Roy Froom (1890– 1974) – pastor; scholar and historian, one of the leading Adventist apologists of his time
 John Edwin Fulton (1869–1945) – pastor; author and missionary to Fiji
 Paul A. Gordon (1930–2009) – former director of the Ellen G. White Estate
 Gerhard Hasel (1935–1994) – theologian; Professor of Old Testament & Biblical Theology; Dean at Theological Seminary at Andrews University, his childhood experience in Nazi Germany are recounted in the book A Thousand Shall Fall
 Edward Heppenstall (1901–1994) – theologian and Bible scholar
 Edward Hilliard (1851–1936) – pastor and missionary to Australia and Tonga
 John F. Huenergardt (1875–1955) – pastor; teacher; administrator, and missionary
 Merritt Kellogg (1832–1921) – doctor; pastor and missionary to Australia; Niue; Pitcairn; Samoa, and Tonga
 George R. Knight – historian, author, educator, theologian
 Väinö Kohtanen (1889–1963) – Finnish pioneer, evangelist, college president and conference president in Finland in the first half of the 20th century
 Samuel Koranteng-Pipim – Ghanaian theologian; author, and speaker
 Hans Karl LaRondelle (1929–2011) – theologian and author
 John G. Matteson (1835–1896) – Danish American; minister; evangelist; teacher; missionary to Denmark and Norway; musician; editor, and publisher
 Andrew Nelson (1893–1975) – scholar of East Asian languages and literature and missionary to Japan
 Dwight Nelson – pastor at Andrews University
 Francis D. Nichol (1897–1966) – apologist, authored a classic defense of Ellen White; editor of Review and Herald, now Adventist Review, (1966–1966); supervising editor of the Seventh-day Adventist Bible Commentary.
 James R. Nix – Director of the Ellen G. White Estate
 Elizaphan Ntakirutimana (1924–2007) – pastor; administrator, and participant in Rwandan genocide
 Robert W. Olson (1920–2013) – former director of the Ellen G. White Estate
 Arthur Patrick (1934–2013) – theologian; teacher; pastor; evangelist; administer, and historian at Avondale College
 Jon Paulien – leading expert on the Book of Revelation
 Richard Rice – developed the "open theism" understanding of God
 H. M. S. Richards (1894–1985) – poet, evangelist; founder and 1st Speaker/Director of Voice of Prophecy; pioneer in religious radio broadcasting; the H. M. S. Richards Divinity School at La Sierra University is named in his honor 
 Ángel Manuel Rodríguez – pastor; professor; theologian, and former director of the Biblical Research Institute 
 Samir Selmanovic – pastor and author 
 George Vandeman (1916–2000) – popular evangelist who founded It Is Written (1956–1991) 
 Alfred Vaucher (1887–1993) – French theologian; church historian and bibliographer
 Morris Venden (1932–2013) – proponent of salvation and sanctification by faith alone, a strong supporter of the Pillars of Seventh-day Adventism including the investigative judgment, known for his parables and humor.
 Juan Carlos Viera (1938–2016) – former director of the Ellen G. White Estate 
 Arthur L. White (1907–1991) – former director of the Ellen G. White Estate; son of William C. White and grandson of Ellen G. White
 William C. White (1854–1937) – former director of the Ellen G. White Estate and son of Ellen G. White
 Benjamin G. Wilkinson (1872–1968) – theologian whose writings influenced the American fundamentalist King-James-Only Movement
 Kenneth H. Wood (1917–2008) – pastor; author; editor of Adventist Review; missionary to China, and Chairman of the Ellen G. White Estate
 Norman Young – New Testament scholar

Military
 Admiral Barry Black – 2nd African American Seventh-day Adventist to become chaplain in U.S. Navy Reserve; Chief of Chaplains of the United States Navy (2000–2003) and first African American Chaplain of the United States Senate (2003–present)
 Harlon Block (1924–1945) – one of the six U.S. Marines captured in the famous photograph Raising the Flag on Iwo Jima; appears on the right of the photo, holding the base of the flagpole; won a Purple Heart and other military awards
 Desmond Doss (1919–2006) – conscientious objector to receive the U.S. Medal of Honor from President Harry S. Truman and subject of the Hollywood biopic Hacksaw Ridge
 Jovie Espenido – Police Chief Inspector of Philippine National Police is the most requested chief of police in the Philippines under President Dutertes war against drugs program
 Captain Washington Johnson, II – 3rd African American Seventh-day Adventist to become chaplain in U.S. Navy Reserve (Ceremony to take place in October)
 Biuku Gasa and Eroni Kumana – Solomon Islanders who rescued the surviving crew of the sunken United States boat PT-109, including its commander, future U.S. president John F. Kennedy, during the Pacific Ocean theatre of World War II; were educated at Adventist missionary schools
 Bo Mya (1927–2006) – Karen rebel leader from Myanmar
 Brigadier General Loree Sutton – American who served in the United States Army and politician
 Alois Vocásek (1896–2003) – last surviving Czechoslovakian veteran of World War I and was the oldest member in the church in the Czech Republic 
 Gabrielle Weidner (1914–1945) – Dutch resistance fighter who died of malnutrition at a Nazi concentration camp & sister of Johan Hendrik Weidner
 Johan Hendrik Weidner (1912–1994) – organized the Dutch-Paris underground network to coordinate the escapes of more than 1,000 people from Nazi-occupied France; later emigrated to the United States and operated a chain of health-food stores

Other
 Johnny Barnes – a Bermuda institution mentioned him in guidebooks and profiled him in two documentary films
 Lindy Chamberlain – Australian Adventist famous for being wrongfully convicted of the murder of her daughter Azaria at Uluru; it was later shown that a dingo took Lindy's baby and was the subject of the film Evil Angels
 Michael Chamberlain – pastor from Australia falsely accused of murdering his daughter Azaria and was the subject in the film Evil Angels
 Michał Belina Czechowski – missionary to Italy, Romania, and Switzerland
 Queen Mantfombi Dlamini – married to Zulu King Goodwill Zwelithini kaBhekuzulu
 S. M. I. Henry (1839–1900) – evangelist for the Woman's Christian Temperance Union; wrote tracts, pamphlets and books
 Mutinta Hichilema - First Lady of Zambia and married to Hakainde Hichilema
 Albert Horsley – miner who murdered former Idaho Governor Frank Steunenberg
 Nkechi Ikpeazu – Nigerian charities worker; founder of Vicar Hope Foundation and wife of the Governor of Abia State, Dr. Okezie Ikpeazu
 Jon Johanson – Australian aviator who flew around the world three times, in 1995, 1996, and 2000 which he flew over the North Pole and he flew to the South Pole in 2003
 Heather Kuzmich – American fashion model and contestant on America's Next Top Model (season 9)
 Louise Little (1897–1991) – Grenadian-American] activist and mother of Malcolm X
 Irene Morgan (1917–2007) – African-American who refused to surrender her bus seat and was taken to court, preceding the famous Rosa Parks case
 Barbara O'Neill – Australian naturopath who, in 2019, was banned indefinitely from providing any health service or education for her role in providing dangerous health advice.
 Sandra Seifert – Filipino/German fashion model who won Miss Earth-Air at the Miss Earth 2009 pageant
 John Tay – Missionary to Fiji and Pitcairn
 Lynne Waihee – former First Lady of Hawaii and married to the former Governor John D. Waihe'e III

Former baptized members and people raised
 Anthony B – Jamaican deejay and member of the Rastafari movement 
 Les Balsiger – belonged to a Seventh-day Adventist Church that was disfellowshipped for firing their minister
 Joseph R. Bartlett – former member of the Maryland House of Delegates who was raised Seventh-day Adventist, and son of Roscoe Bartlett
 Jungkook – idol, BTS member raised by an Adventist mother
 Ryan J. Bell – former pastor who became an atheist
 Wayne Bent – former pastor who founded Lord Our Righteousness Church
 Usain Bolt – Jamaican Olympic sprinter who competed in three Summer Olympics (2008, 2012, and 2016), winning eight gold medals; raised Seventh-day Adventist by his mother
 Nana Kwaku Bonsam – Ghanaian witch doctor and fetish priest 
 Robert Brinsmead – edited Present Truth Magazine
 Joyce Bryant – African-American singer/dancer, and former Seventh-day Adventist
 D. M. Canright (1840–1919) – pastor who left over difficulties concerning Ellen White
 Bill Chambers – Australian country singer
 Kasey Chambers – Australian country singer/songwriter and daughter of Bill Chambers
 Nash Chambers – Australian country singer and son of Bill Chambers
 Ludwig R. Conradi (1856–1939) – missionary and evangelist
 Daniel Cooper (1881–1923) – New Zealand child murderer and illegal abortionist who was disfellowshipped
 Heidi Cruz – wife of Ted Cruz; former employee for President George W. Bush; bank employee, and raised Seventh-day Adventist by her parents 
 Kat Von D – tattoo artist; model; musician; author; entrepreneur; and television personality and raised Seventh-day Adventist by her parents
 Clifton Davis – former Seventh-day Adventist pastor; songwriter; singer, and actor on That's My Mama and Amen.
 Luke Ford – Australian/American writer; blogger; and former pornography gossip columnist
 Vincent Harding (1931–2014) – former African American Seventh-day Adventist pastor who became a Mennonite pastor; civil rights author, and associate of Martin Luther King Jr. who wrote the main draft of King's 1967 speech "Beyond Vietnam: A Time to Break Silence".
 Victor Houteff (1885–1955) – founder of the Shepherd's Rod offshoot
 Moses Hull (1836–1907) – former pastor who became a Spiritualist lecturer and author
 Angus T. Jones - American child actor who played Jake Harper in Two and a Half Men
 John Harvey Kellogg (1852–1943) – medical doctor who was disfellowshipped, co-founder of cornflakes with brother Will Keith Kellogg and subject of the Hollywood film The Road to Wellville
 Hamaas Abdul Khaalis (1921–2003) – Islamic leader who led the 1977 Hanafi Siege
 David Koresh (1959–1993) – American leader of the Branch Davidians religious sect, believing himself to be its final prophet
 Sandra Lee - American celebrity chef and author raised in the Seventh-day Adventist Church
 Zhang Lingsheng – helped start the True Jesus Church
 Luciano – Jamaican roots reggae singer
 Lee Boyd Malvo – former Seventh-day Adventist and convicted murderer who was connected to the D.C. sniper attacks in the Washington metropolitan area and converted to Islam
 Jesse Martin – boy sailor; his parents were Adventists
Kenneth Chi McBride – raised Seventh-day Adventist by his parents; singer-songwriter & actor
 Brian McKnight – raised Seventh-day Adventist by his parents; Grammy Award winning singer-songwriter;producer; radio host, and 2009 The Celebrity Apprentice contestant
 Ronald Numbers – science historian and author of The Creationists, and former Adventist lecturer
 David Pendleton – former member of the Hawaii House of Representatives and 2002 candidate for lieutenant governor, now a Catholic
 T. M. Preble (1810–1907) – wrote articles against the Seventh-day Sabbath in The World's Crisis and a book First-Day Sabbath
 Forrest Preston – American billionaire who was raised in the Seventh-day Adventist Church, the founder of Life Care Centers of America
 Cherie Priest – former Seventh-day Adventist, American novelist and blogger
 Prince (1958–2016) – raised in the church, later converted to the Jehovah's Witnesses
 Mark "Chopper" Read (1954–2013) – notorious Australian ex-criminal and author of real and fictional crime books; claims in his books to have been raised Adventist by a strictly devout mother
 Walter T. Rea (1922–2014) – former pastor for his criticisms of the inspiration of Ellen G. White; author of The White Lie
 Busta Rhymes – American rapper, producer and actor, raised in Brooklyn by Seventh-day Adventist Jamaican-immigrant parents; later converted to Islam
 Terrence Roberts – former African American member who was a psychologist; civil rights activist; speaker; taught at Pacific Union College (1975–1977); Director of mental health services at St. Helena Hospital and Health Center (1977–1985); Assistant Dean in the UCLA School of Social Welfare (1985–1993); taught psychology at Antioch University Los Angeles; founder of Terrence Roberts Consulting, and one of the nine African American students who desegregated Little Rock Central High School
 Benjamin Roden (1902–1978) – religious leader and organizer of the Branch Davidian Seventh-day Adventist Church, who was disfellowshipped
 Lois Roden (1916–1986) – wife of Benjamin Roden and president of the Branch Davidians after her husband's death
 G. G. Rupert (1847–1922) – former American Seventh-day Adventist minister who founded Independent Church of God
 Paul Rusesabagina – internationally honored for saving 1,268 civilians during the Rwandan genocide; the subject of 2004 film Hotel Rwanda; describes himself as a "lapsed Adventist" in his autobiography
 Lena Sadler (1875–1939) – American surgeon and obstetrician who was the wife of William S. Sadler
 William S. Sadler (1875–1969) – American surgeon; self trained psychiatrist and author who helped publish The Urantia Book
 Ahn Sahng-hong (1918–1985) – Korean pastor and founder of Witnesses of Jesus Church of God
 Dumelang Saleshando – Botswanan politician raised Seventh-day Adventist by his mother, now is member of an unspecified church
 Augusto César Sandino (1895–1934) – Nicaraguan revolutionary and politician, cooperativist, member of Adventist church in his youth, adopted vegetarianism due to church teachings
 Vladimir Shelkov (1895–1980) – former Ukrainian Seventh-day Adventist minister and leader of the True and Free Seventh-day Adventists
 Sirhan Sirhan – Palestinian convicted of the assassination of U.S. Senator Robert F. Kennedy
 Heinz Spanknöbel (1893–1947) – former German Seventh-day Adventist minister and led the pro Nazi Friends of New Germany 
 Mathew Staver – former American Seventh-day Adventist pastor who became a Southern Baptist; professor and lawyer; also founding member and Chairman of Liberty Counsel and dean at Liberty University
 Sean Taylor (1983–2007) – former African American member who played for the Washington Redskins and was murdered
 Iya Villania – Filipina host, actress and performer, married to Drew Arellano, a Catholic. She was already excommunicated by the church before her marriage.
 Paul Wei – Chinese evangelist of the True Jesus Church
 Richard Wright (1908–1960) – author whose autobiography Black Boy mentions clashes with his Adventist family
 Malcolm X (1925–1965) – American Muslim minister and human rights activist, raised Adventist by his mother

See also
 Seventh-day Adventism in popular culture

References

External links

Seventh-day Adventists
List
Seventh-day Adventist Church-related lists